Georg Adolf Keferstein  (October 10, 1793 in Halle (Saale) - November 28, 1884 in Erfurt) was a German lawyer (most recently in Erfurt) and entomologist. He is not to be confused with Wilhelm Moritz Keferstein.

Georg Keferstein collected butterflies from his youth and published specifically on the history of entomology, for example about the silkworm in antiquity. An example is Der Bombyx oder Bombylius des Aristoteles als Seide hervorbringendes Insekt. Verhandlungen k.u.k. Zoolog.-Botan. Ges. Wien, 1882. He published in the Revue Entomologique edited by Gustave Silbermann , in Isis edited by Lorenz Oken , in the proceedings of the Imperial Zoological and Botanical Society and in the Szczecin Entomology Journal.

First descriptions from his extensive collection were mostly by Gottlieb August Herrich-Schäffer. He himself described Tritonaclia tollini amongst other species. The Keferstein collection is held by the University of Halle together with his valuable entomological library. Keferstein was a member of the Halle Masonic Lodge.

References 
 Gaedike, R.; Groll, E. K. & Taeger, A. 2012: Bibliography of the entomological literature from the beginning until 1863 : online database – version 1.0 – Senckenberg Deutsches Entomologisches Institut.
Groll, E. K. 2017: Biographies of the Entomologists of the World. – Online database, version 8, Senckenberg Deutsches Entomologisches Institut, Müncheberg – URL: sdei.senckenberg.de/biografies

German lepidopterists
1884 deaths
1793 births
People from Halle (Saale)
18th-century German lawyers
19th-century German lawyers
18th-century German scientists
19th-century German scientists
German Freemasons